Mendi is the capital of the Southern Highlands Province of Papua New Guinea.

Mendi may also refer to:

People
 The Mendi people of Sierra Leone, West Africa
 The Mendi Bible, presented to John Quincy Adams by freed slaves from the Amistad
 Mendi Rodan (1929–2009), Israeli conductor, composer and violinist
 Mendi Msimang, treasurer of the African National Congress
 Mendi Mengjiqi (born 1958), Kosovar Albanian composer
 Mendi Obadike (born 1973), Igbo Nigerian American musician, poet and conceptual artist

Papua New Guinea places and languages
 Mendi language, also called Angal, spoken in Papua New Guinea and unrelated to the African people noted above
 Mendi Urban LLG, Papua New Guinea
 Lower Mendi Rural LLG, Papua New Guinea
 Upper Mendi Rural LLG, Papua New Guinea

Ships
 , a 1905 British steamship used as troop carrier by the Royal Navy, sunk in 1917
 , a frigate of the South African Navy, launched 2003
 Mendi (barque), a black-owned ship serving Liberia

Other
 Mendi, Ethiopia, a town
 Mehndi (or henna), used for body painting
 CD Mendi, a minor Spanish football club